Thiomescaline (TM) is a pair of lesser-known psychedelic drugs with the molecular formula C11H17NO2S. 3-TM and 4-TM are analogs of mescaline in which an oxygen atom has been replaced with a sulfur atom. They were first synthesized by Alexander Shulgin and described in his book PiHKAL. Very little data exists on the pharmacological properties, metabolism, and toxicity of thiomescaline.

3-TM

Dosage: 60–100 mg

Duration: 8–12 hours

Effects: strong open and closed-eye visuals, synesthesia upon listening to music, +++ on the Shulgin Rating Scale

4-TM

Dosage: 20–40 mg

Duration: 10–15 hours

Effects: LSD-like imagery and effects

See also 
 Thioescaline

References

Psychedelic phenethylamines
Thioethers